Serenichthys kowiensis is a fossil species of coelacanth described in 2015 from near Grahamstown in South Africa.

Some 30 complete specimens of this new species were found in the black shale lagerstätte on Waterloo Farm, preserved by the mud of an ancient estuary dating back to the Famennian stage of the Late Devonian some 360 million years ago. In an article published in the Zoological Journal of the Linnean Society and jointly authored by paleontologists Michael Coates of the University of Chicago and Robert Gess from the University of the Witwatersrand, the find is described as the earliest coelacanth to be discovered from Africa. Gess first identified coelacanth remains from this locality in the 1990s, but these were poorly preserved and unsuitable for formal description. Subsequent work produced many more specimens, some preserved in fine detail. According to the authors it is the Devonian coelacanth most similar to the hypothetical ancestor of modern coelacanths - its fossil remains lie a mere 100 km from the mouth of the Chalumna River, where Latimeria chalumnae was first found in 1938. In keeping with the use of river names, 'kowiensis' is after the Kowie River which has its headwaters in the hills surrounding the site, while 'Serenichthys' honours Serena Gess, who provided storage space for some 70 tons of fossil-bearing black shale.

Coelacanths are thought to have originated in the Devonian, 419.2 ± 3.2 million years ago. Five species of reconstructable coelacanth were previously known from this period, and were found in North America, Europe, China and Australia. At the time these fossils formed in an estuary adjacent to the semi-enclosed Agulhas Sea, Africa was still part of Gondwana, together with India, Australia, Antarctica and South America. All the whole impressions found were of juveniles, suggesting that S. kowiensis was using this shallow estuary as a nursery, behaviour still seen in modern fish. The extant coelacanth, Latimeria, bears live young, but whether these also congregate in nurseries is as yet unknown. This site becomes the earliest known coelacanth nursery, predating Rhabdoderma exiguum in the 300 million-year-old Mazon Creek beds of Illinois.

All specimens of Serenichthys kowiensis have been added to the palaeontological collection of the Albany Museum in Grahamstown.

Description abstract

See also
Priscomyzon
Gondwanascorpio emzantsiensis

References

External links
 Road works on the Waterloo Farm cutting on the N2 road bypass outside Grahamstown

Coelacanthiformes
Prehistoric lobe-finned fish genera